
Mauesee (or Germanized Mauensee, Lake of Mauen) is a lake in the canton of Lucerne, Switzerland, near the town Mauensee. Mauensee Castle is built on an islet in the 0.55 km2 (136 acre) large lake. It was built in 1605 for the Pfyffer family.

See also
List of lakes of Switzerland

External links
Mauensee castle 

Lakes of Switzerland
Lakes of the canton of Lucerne
LMauensee